Semandang, or Onya Darat, is a Dayak language of Borneo.

In 2020, the original ISO 639-3 code for Semandang was split into three separate codes for Beginci, Gerai, and Semandang.

References

Languages of Indonesia
Land Dayak languages